Walter Byers (March 13, 1922 – May 26, 2015) was the first executive director of the National Collegiate Athletic Association.

Career
Byers was the first executive director of the National Collegiate Athletic Association.  He served from 1951 to 1988.  He also helped start the United States Basketball Writers Association in 1956. Byers expanded the NCAA men's basketball tournament in 1951 from 8 to 16 teams.

WFAN New York's Mike Francesa referred to him as an "Oz-like" figure who ran the NCAA with ultimate control. Byers was also described as a "petty tyrant." The New York Times said that he was sometimes known as "That power-mad Walter Byers."

Byers negotiated TV contracts that preempted individual colleges' rights on the way to building a billion-dollar business, leading to a 1984 U.S. Supreme Court ruling that freed the colleges to negotiate on their own.  

The NCAA Walter Byers Scholarship is named in his honor. On May 26, 2015, Byers died at the age of 93.

Book
In his book Unsportsmanlike Conduct: Exploiting College Athletes Byers turned against the NCAA in its then-current form, saying it established "a nationwide money-laundering scheme."  (P. 73).  Byers also said that the NCAA developed the term "student-athlete" in order to insulate the colleges from having to provide long-term disability payments to players injured while playing their sport (and making money for their university and the NCAA).  (P. 69). Byers said that Congress should "Free the Athletes," and enact a "comprehensive College Athletes' Bill of Rights."  (P. 374).  He said that "the federal government should require deregulation of a monopoly business operated by not-for-profit institutions contracting together to achieve maximum financial returns... Collegiate amateurism is... an economic camouflage for monopoly practice. . . , [one which] 'operat[es] an air-tight racket of supplying cheap athletic labor.'"  (Pp. 376, 388).

See also
College Football Association

References

External links

 SI.com article on Byers
 The Shame of College Sports – Taylor Branch, The Atlantic, September 7, 2011
  ‘Student-Athlete’ Has Always Been a Lie - By Nathan Kalman-Lamb, Jay M. Smith, and Stephen T. Casper, The Chronicle of Higher Education, December 6, 2021
 

1922 births
2015 deaths
American sportswriters
National Collegiate Athletic Association people
National Collegiate Basketball Hall of Fame inductees